Macrourus berglax, the roughhead grenadier or onion-eye grenadier, is a species of marine ray-finned fish in the family Macrouridae. It is a deep-water fish found in the Atlantic Ocean.

Description
The roughhead grenadier can reach a length of one metre. The head occupies about one quarter of the total length of the fish, it has a slender body and long tapering tail. There are some bony spiny scutes or scales on the upper side of the head but the lower side is scaleless. The snout is pointed and the small mouth is set far back on the lower side of the head with a short barbel underneath. There are 3 to 5 rows of sharp teeth in the upper jaw and 1 or 2 rows in the lower jaw. The eye is large and bulbous, giving the fish its alternative name of onion-eye grenadier. There are two dorsal fins, the front one having 11 to 13 finrays and the hind one running along the back to the tip of the tail. The anal fin is similarly long and narrow and there is no tailfin. The body is covered in large ridged, spiny scales. The general body colour is grey, darker underneath, with dark fins and dark edges to some of the scales.

Distribution
Its range includes the waters around Greenland and Iceland, and extends in the west from the Bear Seamount, Norfolk Canyon and Georges Bank north to Labrador and the Davis Strait and in the east from Ireland north to the Faeroe Islands, Norway, Spitzbergen and the Barents Sea.

Biology
The roughhead grenadier feeds on crustaceans and other small invertebrates it finds on the seabed. The diet includes small fish, shrimps, amphipods, polychaete worms, bivalve molluscs, isopods, brittle stars, other echinoderms and comb jellies.

The roughhead grenadier is a slow growing fish. The potential fecundity of the female is 17,000 to 56,000 eggs. The eggs are laid in batches and spawning takes place at any time of year, with a peak in late winter and early spring.

Fishery
The roughhead grenadier is landed as a by-catch when fishing for Greenland halibut (Reinhardtius hippoglossoides) and Atlantic halibut (Hippoglossus hippoglossus). In a study off the east coast of Greenland, more males were taken by trawling and more females by long line. This seemed to be due to the females being in the depth range  while the males predominated at shallower depths.

References

Macrouridae
Fish described in 1801